Larry Glick (May 16, 1922 – March 26, 2009)  was an American talk radio host, based in Boston, Massachusetts, who presented a long-running show on WBZ and later WHDH through the 1960s, 1970s and 1980s. His broadcast at WBZ covered 38 states, Larry was well known wherever he went and was liked by all. A memorable part of his broadcasts were the countless people who would call in to talk about anything and everything, from personal problems to worldly problems. In his heyday many would say he ran the nighttime airways. Larry was known for his easy going manner and great sense of humor.

In Boston, Glick's all-night show went out first over WMEX in 1965. In 1967, he was hired by WBZ, where he worked for the next 20 years.  Glick ended his radio career at WHDH in 1992.

From his retirement until 2007, Glick was the Ambassador of Good Will for the Legal Sea Foods Restaurant in the Boca Raton Mall in Florida. In September 2008, he was inducted into the Massachusetts Broadcasters Hall of Fame at Massasoit Community College in Dedham, Massachusetts.

Outside of his broadcasting career, Glick was trained as a pilot and was a founding partner in a commercial hypnotherapy business in Brookline, Massachusetts.

Glick died on March 26, 2009, following complications during open-heart surgery.

References

External links
The Larry Glick Pictures and Audio Page by Buffalonian Steve Cichon
 The Boston Radio Dial: WBZ(AM)
 Nickerblog "Glick University"
 Northeast Airchecks
 Jerry Williams Memories
 The Larry Glick Tribute Site
 The Larry Glick Podcast Page - Over 100 Larry Glick air checks from 1976 and 1977
 The Larry Glick Podcast Page 2 - Larry Glick air checks from 1978 onward

American talk radio hosts
Radio personalities from Boston
1922 births
2009 deaths